Revaz Tsirek'idze (born 28 March 1934) is a Soviet Olympic fencer. He competed in the individual and team épée events at the 1956 Summer Olympics.

References

1934 births
Living people
Russian male épée fencers
Soviet male épée fencers
Male épée fencers from Georgia (country)
Olympic fencers of the Soviet Union
Fencers at the 1956 Summer Olympics
Sportspeople from Kutaisi